The Swedish Trotting Oaks (Swedish: Svenskt Trav-Oaks or only Oaks) is an annual national Group One harness event for trotters that is held at Solvalla in Stockholm, Sweden. It is the biggest race for 3-year-old fillies in Sweden.
The purse in the 2008 final was ≈US$286,000 (SEK 2,000,000), of which the winner Annicka won half.

Location and date
The Swedish Trotting Oaks has, since the start in 1979, been arranged at Solvalla in Stockholm. In 1979, as well as during the years 1991-1994 and from 1998 to present, the finals have been held on the same day  in late September or early October as the Swedish Trotting Criterium finals. In 1980 and in 1995–1997, the Oaks finals were raced up to a week before or after the Criterium finals. 1981–1990, the Oaks finals took place in July or August.

Entering the event
To enter the Swedish Trotting Oaks, a filly owner is obliged to make four payments of totally ≈US$530 (SEK4,125) as of 2009. These payments are as well valid for the Swedish Trotting Criterium, which is held at the same day as the Oaks but are open for both colts and fillies. In addition to these costs, a supplementary fee of ≈US$410 (SEK3,180) is paid to enter the elimination races before the final. If a filly owner decides to enter the Criterium instead of the Oaks, the supplementary fee is twice as large, ≈US$820 (SEK6,360).

Racing conditions

Distance
The distance in the Swedish Trotting Oaks is 2,140 meters (1.33 mile). This was the case in the premiere year of 1979, and has not been altered since.

Starting method
The first year, volt start was used in the Oaks, but from the second year and on, auto start has been used.

Past winners

Drivers with most wins
 4 - Stig H. Johansson 
 4 - Örjan Kihlström
 2 - Leif Witasp
 2 - Lennart Forsgren
 2 - Torbjörn Jansson
 2 - Jim Frick

Trainers with most wins
 6 - Stig H. Johansson
 2 - Leif Witasp
 2 - Roger Walmann
 2 - Tommy Hanné

Sires with at least two winning offsprings
 2 - Count's Pride (Santa Pride, Eva Pride)
 2 - Shatter Way (Divina Tilly, Pink Lady)
 2 - The Prophet (Prophet Jill, Louise)

Mares with at least two winning offsprings
 2 - Pixie (Emma Gee San, Kimbee San)

Winning mares that have also brood winners
 Pixie (1982), dam of Emma Gee San (1993) and Kimbee San (1999)

Winner with lowest odds
 Winning odds: 1.32 - Pixie (1982)

Winner with highest odds
 Winning odds: 32.94 - Early Southwind (2006)

Fastest winners

Auto start (1980 - present)
 1:13.9 (km rate) - Annicka (2008)

Volt start (1979)
 1:20.8 (km rate) - Prophet Jill (1979)

All winners of the Swedish Trotting Oaks

References

Harness races in Sweden